The  were a class of riverine gunboats of the Imperial Japanese Navy. The class consisted of two vessels: Atami (熱海) and Futami (二見).

 
Riverine warfare
Gunboat classes